Aghvan Papikyan (born 8 February 1994) is a professional footballer who plays as a winger. Born in Poland, he was a member of the Armenia national team.

Club career
Aghvan was a pupil of the football academy ŁKS Łódź. He completed the stages of the club academy along with his older brother Volodya. In 2011, he was included in the first team. Papikyan played 8 matches in total for Łódź.

In February 2013, he transferred to Spartak Moscow.

On 4 September 2020, less than a month after joining FC Alashkert, he moved to Ararat Yerevan.

International career
Aghvan Papikyan has played for the junior and youth teams of Armenia. He has stated, "I play for the Armenia because that's where my roots are from and I feel Armenian." Papikyan had no desire to join the Poland national football team and couldn't anyway due to citizenship issues, but said he still "feels something towards Poland".

After a match between the Armenia U21 and Armenia national teams on 21 March 2013, Papikyan was among three youth players chosen by the Football Federation of Armenia to join the senior team.

Personal life
Aghvan is the son of Armenian former football player and current football manager Arsen Papikyan and also has a one-year older brother Volodya who played midfielder for ŁKS Łódź with Aghvan. His parents and brother were born in Armenia and decided to work and live to Poland, where Aghvan was born one year later. 

Although born in Poland, he only obtained Polish citizenship on 2 October 2017.

References

External links
 
 

1994 births
Living people
Sportspeople from Łódź
Armenian footballers
Armenia international footballers
Armenian expatriate footballers
Polish people of Armenian descent
Citizens of Armenia through descent
ŁKS Łódź players
FC Spartak Moscow players
FC Pyunik players
Ulisses FC players
GKS Bełchatów players
Raków Częstochowa players
Olimpia Grudziądz players
Chojniczanka Chojnice players
FC Alashkert players
FC Ararat Yerevan players
Wisła Puławy players
Ekstraklasa players
I liga players
II liga players
Armenian Premier League players
Expatriate footballers in Poland
Expatriate footballers in Russia
Armenian expatriate sportspeople in Poland
Armenian expatriate sportspeople in Russia
Armenia under-21 international footballers
Association football midfielders